Amayapur is a census village in the Nalbari district, Assam, India. According to the 2011 Census of India, Amayapur has a total population of 1,463, with 751 males and 712 females, and a literacy rate of 84.76%.

References 

Villages in Nalbari district